Eucithara bisacchii is a small sea snail, a marine gastropod mollusk in the family Mangeliidae.

Description
The length of the shell attains 5.5 mm, its diameter 2.4 mm.

The outer lip shows  eight distinct denticles. The shell has 11 axial ribs per whorl and on the body whorl, and fine, minute spiral sculpture (about 38 lirae on the penultimate whorl).

Distribution
This marine species occurs in the Red Sea and off Eritrea.

References

 Hornung, A., and G. Mermod. "Mollusques de la Mer Rouge recueillis par A. Issel faisant partie des collections du Musée Civique d’Histoire Naturelle de Gênes. Cinquième et dernière partie: Pleurotomides et Mitrides." Annali del Museo Civico di Storia Naturale di Geno va 53 (1928): 108-121.

External links
  Tucker, J.K. 2004 Catalog of recent and fossil turrids (Mollusca: Gastropoda). Zootaxa 682:1-1295.
 Kilburn R.N. 1992. Turridae (Mollusca: Gastropoda) of southern Africa and Mozambique. Part 6. Subfamily Mangeliinae, section 1. Annals of the Natal Museum, 33: 461–575

Endemic fauna of Eritrea
bisacchii
Gastropods described in 1928